Total Security may refer to:
Total Security (TV series), 1997 TV series
Total Security (malware)